Mohammad Ali is a Pakistani politician from Upper Dir District who was a member of the Khyber Pakhtunkhwa Assembly from 2013 to 2018, belongs to Jamaat-e-Islami Pakistan. He is also serving as chairman and member of the different committees.

Political career
Ali was elected as the member of the Khyber Pakhtunkhwa Assembly on ticket of Jamaat-e-Islami Pakistan from PK-92 (Upper Dir-II) in 2013 Pakistani general election.

References

Living people
Year of birth missing (living people)
Jamaat-e-Islami Pakistan politicians
Khyber Pakhtunkhwa MPAs 2013–2018
People from Upper Dir District